Middle Island Presbyterian Church (now known as Middle Island United Church of Christ) is a historic Presbyterian church at 271 Middle Country Road in Middle Island, Suffolk County, New York.

The Federal style church building was constructed in 1837 by the Middle Island Presbyterian congregation with several later renovations and additions. The Presbyterian congregation built a new building in 1966.  Later, a United Church of Christ congregation purchased the 1837 church building. The historic church building was added to the National Register of Historic Places in 2005.

References

External links
Middle Island United Church of Christ (current congregation)
Middle Island Presbyterian Church (former congregation that built the church)
Middle Island United Church of Christ (Longwood's Journey)

Presbyterian churches in New York (state)
Churches on the National Register of Historic Places in New York (state)
Federal architecture in New York (state)
Churches completed in 1837
19th-century Presbyterian church buildings in the United States
Churches in Suffolk County, New York
National Register of Historic Places in Suffolk County, New York